L'Express is a French-language daily newspaper, published in Mauritius since 1963 and owned by La Sentinelle, Ltd. L'Express endeavours to cover Mauritian news in an independent and impartial manner, as described in its code of conduct for journalists. It is the most widely-read daily in Mauritius and constantly changes to keep up with the latest trends in journalism and the newspaper business. The Sunday version of L'Express is called L'Express Dimanche.

See also 
List of newspapers in Mauritius

References

External links 
 
 Real Estate Portal Mauritius L'express Property
 Official Facebook Page

1963 establishments in Mauritius
Newspapers published in Mauritius
Newspapers established in 1963
French-language newspapers published in Africa